Albany County Sheriff may refer to:
 Albany County Sheriff's Department in Albany County, New York
 Albany County Sheriff's Office in Albany County, Wyoming

Sheriffs' departments of the United States